SS Waigstill Avery (MC contract 910) was a Liberty ship built in the United States during World War II. She was named after Waightstill Avery, the first Attorney General of North Carolina who fought a duel with Andrew Jackson in 1788.

The ship was laid down by North Carolina Shipbuilding Company in their Cape Fear River yard on March 24, 1943, and launched on April 22, 1943.  Avery was chartered to the Polarus Steamship Company until October 1947 by the War Shipping Administration.  A.L. Burbank delivered her to the Wilmington Fleet of the National Defense Reserve Fleet in November 1947.  The vessel was sold for scrap in 1960.

Awards 
The Avery's Naval Armed Guard detachment received one battle star for World War II service during Convoy UGS-37, when the convoy came under air attack.

References 

Liberty ships
Ships built in Wilmington, North Carolina
1943 ships